Eduardo Silva may refer to:
 Eduardo Alves da Silva (born 1983), Brazilian-born Croatian footballer
 Eduardo Adelino da Silva (born 1979), Brazilian footballer
 Eduardo da Silva (footballer, born 1966), Uruguayan former footballer
 Eduardo Francisco de Silva Neto (born 1980), Brazilian footballer